The 2009 FIBA Europe Under-18 Championship Division C was the 7th edition of the Division C of the FIBA U18 European Championship, the third tier of the European men's under-18 basketball championship. It was played in Valletta, Malta, from 20 to 25 July 2009. The host team, Malta, won the tournament.

Participating teams

First round

Group A

Group B

5th–7th place classification

Playoffs

Final standings

References

FIBA U18 European Championship Division C
2009–10 in European basketball
FIBA U18
International basketball competitions hosted by Malta
FIBA